Juan Manuel Rodríguez López (born in Bilbao in 1945)  is a Spanish-born, naturalized Ecuadorian author and professor. He holds a licenciate/BA degree in philosophy and a doctorate in literature from Pontificia Universidad Católica del Ecuador (PUCE). He was a professor at Universidad Central del Ecuador and Universidad Católica, as well as a founding professor of Universidad San Francisco de Quito, where he was Dean of the College of Communication and Contemporary Arts.

He has published novels and short-story collections in Ecuador, Spain and Mexico, as well as various academic and reference books, including essays and literary criticism. He has also been a columnist and editorial writer for the newspaper La Hora and the magazine Chasqui (CIESPAL).

Published works

Fiction

Short stories

Novels

Non-fiction

Awards
 Second prize, Gabriel Miró International Short Story Contest (Alicante, España), for the short story 'Levedad del vino', 1986.
 Finalist,'Novedades y Diana' International Literary Prize (Mexico), with the novel El espantapájaros, 1988.
 Ecuador's National Prize for Literature 'Aurelio Espinosa Pólit' for the short-story collection Fricciones, 1990.
 Second Prize for Art and Literature, Universidad Central del Ecuador, for the novel El espantapájaros, 1991.
 Finalist,'Planeta/Joaquín Mortiz' Award (Mexico), with the novel La derrota, 1992 (later published in revised form in 2003 as El poder de los vencidos).
 First Prize for Art and Literature, Universidad Central del Ecuador, for the short-story collection El Mar y la Muralla, 1992.
 Third Prize, IV  Biennal Ecuadorian Novel Contest, for the work El pulso de la nada, 1996.
 Doctorado Honoris Causa en Artes ('in artibus') de la Universidad San Francisco de Quito (USFQ), 1998.

References
.
.
.
.
.
.
.
.
.
.
.
.
.
.
.
.
.
.
.
.
.
.
.
.
.
.
.
.
.
.
.
.
.
.
.
.
.
.
.
.

.

External links
Literaturas.com:  entrevista con Juan Manuel Rodríguez
Cintúrón de fuego, Juan Manuel Rodríguez (reseña de Luz Modroño)
Comentario en Cinturón de Fuego

1945 births
Living people
People from Bilbao
Pontifical Catholic University of Ecuador alumni
Academic staff of the Pontifical Catholic University of Ecuador
Academic staff of the Central University of Ecuador
Academic staff of Universidad San Francisco de Quito
Ecuadorian male writers
Spanish emigrants to Ecuador
Naturalized citizens of Ecuador